Carling is a unisex given name of Gaelic Irish origin. It is a variant form of Carl.

Meaning
Little champion

Variant forms
Alternate forms of the name, including spelling variations, nicknames and diminutive forms, include:
Carl
Carla
Carli (given name)
Carlin (given name)
Carlina
Carline

People
 Carling Bassett-Seguso, Canadian professional tennis player and granddaughter of John Carling

See also

Carlina (name)
Carlini (name)
Carlino (name)

References
http://wwwthinkbabynames.com/meaning/1/Carling

Given names